In constructive set theory, the axiom of non-choice is a version of the axiom of choice limiting the choice to just one.

Formal statement
Formally, the axiom can be stated as follows:

Discussion
In ZF (classical Zermelo–Fraenkel set theory without the axiom of choice), this is a theorem derivable from the axiom of replacement.

In intuitionistic Zermelo–Fraenkel set theory, IZF, this statement is derivable from other axioms, since functions are defined as graphs in IZF. In this case  can be defined as and it follows from the definition that it is actually a function.

References

External links
 Michael J. Beeson, Foundations of Constructive Mathematics, Springer, 1985

Axioms of set theory